Kessleria zimmermanni is a moth of the family Yponomeutidae. It is found in Poland and Slovakia.

The length of the forewings is 7-7.2 mm for males and 6.2 mm for females. The forewings are brown. The hindwings are dark brown. Adults are on wing from June to the end of August.

The larvae feed on Saxifraga paniculata. Young larvae mine the leaves of their host plant. The species overwinters twice in the larval stage.

References

Moths described in 1864
Yponomeutidae
Moths of Europe